Phenethyl isothiocyanate (PEITC) is a naturally occurring isothiocyanate whose precursor, gluconasturtiin is found in some cruciferous vegetables, especially watercress.

PEITC has been studied for its potential for chemoprevention of cancers,  such as prostate cancer.

In terms of biosynthesis, PEITC is produced from gluconasturtiin by the action of the enzyme myrosinase.

References

Isothiocyanates